Giannouli is a town and a former municipality in the Larissa regional unit, Thessaly, Greece. Population 12,496 (2011). The municipal unit has an area of 51.092 km2.

References

Populated places in Larissa (regional unit)